E67 may refer to:
 European route E67
 King's Indian Defence, Encyclopaedia of Chess Openings code
 Chūbu-Jūkan Expressway (includes concurrency section with Tōkai-Hokuriku Expressway), route E67 in Japan
 The high-security variant of the E65 BMW 7 Series